Club de Fútbol Panadería Pulido San Mateo is a football team based in Vega de San Mateo, Gran Canaria, Canary Islands. Founded in 1993, the team plays in Segunda División RFEF – Group 4, holding home matches at Campo de Fútbol San Mateo.

History
Founded in 1993 as a football side from a bakery, the club spent the most of their seasons in the regional leagues. In 2016, after finishing second of their group in the Preferente, they achieved promotion to Tercera División.

In June 2021, the club was one of the 54 teams promoted to the newly formed Segunda División RFEF.

Season to season

1 season in Segunda División RFEF
5 seasons in Tercera División

References

External links
Soccerway team profile

Football clubs in the Canary Islands
Association football clubs established in 1993
1993 establishments in Spain
Sport in Gran Canaria